Le Palace is a Paris theatre located at 8, rue du Faubourg-Montmartre in the 9th arrondissement. It is best known for its years as a nightclub.

Created by impresario Fabrice Emaer in 1978, intellectuals, actors, designers, and American and European jetsetters patronised the club for its flamboyant DJ Guy Cuevas, extravagant theme parties and performances, and Emaer's rule-breaking mix of clubgoers that threw together rich and poor, gay and straight, black and white.

After Emaer's death in 1985, Le Palace changed hands and names several times before reopening in 2008 as a theater and concert space of the same name.

History: The Palace Theater 
Constructed in the 17th century, the building on rue on Faubourg Montmartre already had a modern history as theater and dance hall before Fabrice Emaer turned it into one of the hottest nightclubs in Paris.

Baptized Le Palace as early as 1912, by 1923 it served as a music hall hosted by Oscar Dufrenne and Henri Varna who had already directed le Concert Mayol, l'Empire, le Moncey Music-Hall and the Bouffes du Nord. The two changed the name to Eden en Palace in 1923, and in collaboration with the London Palace, had a long run engaging artists like dancer and singer Harry Pilcer and musical clown Grock.

In 1931, Oscar Dufrenne took the bold step of changing the theater into a cinema, a move which came to an end when his nude corpse was discovered on site in 1933, inspiring rumors of rough trade gone bad. Shortly afterwards, his partner Henry Varna changed the space back into a music hall which he called the "Alcazar." It became a cinema again in 1946, recovering its original name and gradually fading from view.

The decrepit building was finally acquired by writer and theater director Pierre Laville in 1975. He began producing experimental theater there, and came to the attention of then Minister of Culture, Michel Guy, who used the space for his Festival d'Automne (Autumn Festival).

When impresario Fabrice Emaer decided to open a place large enough to rival Studio 54 in New York, it was Michel Guy who suggested he buy Le Palace.

Trial Runs: Le Pimm's, Le Sept 
Fabrice Emaer (1935-1983) was already a proven success when he opened Le Palace. He opened in Paris Le Pimm's, the premier gay club on rue Sainte-Anne in 1964. And in 1968 he took over le Sept down the block.

At Club Sept, he was trying to do something totally different from the pick-up club Le Pimm's. The "7" had a restaurant on the ground floor with a small dance floor in the basement simply decorated with mirrors on the walls and a ceiling with multicolored lights that flashed with the music.

The focus was dancing and the Sept quickly became "the epicenter of disco" in part because Emaer hired a young Cuban DJ Guy Cuevas, to work the turntable. Cuevas was largely responsible for introducing Paris to funk and soul playing the O'Jays, Billy Paul, Teddy Pendergrass and Marvin Gaye.

While some attributed Emaer's success largely to Cuevas who had the crowd pressing at its doors and the packing the dance floor, Emaer also accomplished something new with the clientele. He mixed the "jet set" with kids that just wanted to dance, hets with homos, and artists and intellectuals with anyone who had an interesting look.

The combination of excellent music and clientele worked. And after a visit to Studio 54 in New York, Emaer returned with even greater ambitions to create a space that was more than a club, but an experience.

Emaer's Palace 

Delighted with the Palace's decrepit structure which would allow him not just an enormous disco, but the accoutrements of a traditional theater space with stages and an enormous balcony, Fabrice Emaer ordered important construction work, restoring the architecturally classified building, including the decor of the '30s. The colossal expenses which were to be a lasting burden on the future of the club, but in the short term the results were impressive.

Every detail was calculated. The careful interior design extended to the waiters who were dressed in flamboyant red and gold costumes designed by the couturier Thierry Mugler. And on opening night, 1 March 1978, the Palace set the tone for the future by offering an extravagant spectacle in which Grace Jones sang La Vie en Rose surrounded by dry ice and shining roses while perched atop a pink Harley Davidson.

To complete the dramatic experience at the club, the Palace, not content with one laser, had three, along with descending disco balls, and installations by some of the time's most extravagant sculptors and stage designers. There were different lighting effects every night that were so spectacular dancers would stop mid-gesture to watch what was going on.

Emaer also played careful attention to the music.

Among the regulars or its most famous visitors (to name just a few) were Alain Pacadis, of the newspaper Libération who frequently evoked le Palace and its regulars in his chronicles; couturier Karl Lagerfeld; semiotician Roland Barthes, professor at the Collège de France; singer Mick Jagger; American artist Andy Warhol; journalist Frédéric Mitterrand; decorator Andrée Putman; movie producer and illustrator Jean-Paul Goude; model and singer Grace Jones;  couturier Kenzo; couturier Yves Saint Laurent; the CEO of Yves Saint Laurent and friend of François Mitterrand, Pierre Bergé; actress Alice Sapritch;  impersonator of celebrities Thierry Le Luron; publicist and art gallery owner Cyril Putman.

The decoration of the place was entrusted to Gérard Garouste, the creation of the furniture to Elisabeth Garouste.

Fabrice Emaer died in 1983.

After Emaer 
Le Palace of the years 1983/1989 gave birth to the Parisian infatuation with House Music with the parties of Jean-Claude Lacreze or of La Nicole (Nicolas), but specially the Pyramid parties around 1987, organized by the English of S-Express. The Australian artist Leigh Bowery was frequently invited there. On 15 July 1987, Leigh Bowery flew over to Paris with the cult British band You You You Also, the Gay Tea Dance that originated with the openly gay Emaer received two to three thousand participants each Sunday afternoon.

In 1992, Régine herself, former 'rival' of the night of Fabrice Emaer, "Queen of the Parisian Night", tried to take over the site, followed in 1994 by the couple David and Cathy Guetta who tried to relaunch it with le Privilège, renovated and renamed Kitkat. The decorations of Garouste disappeared.

The place closed definitively in 1996, and was occupied by squatters for several years. In 2007, the brothers Alil and Hazis Vardar, Belgians of Albanian origin purchased the hall with the money of Francis and Chantal Lemaire, proprietors of Radio Contact in Belgium. The Vardar brothers already owned Comédie République and Grande Comédie, Parisian halls with 200 and 400 seats which were filled every night because of good comedies. After its remodeling, they reopened Le Palace (970 seats) to offer, since 2007, popular comedies, one-man shows, and television broadcasts.

See also
List of electronic dance music venues

References

Bibliography 
 Roland Barthes, Au Palace ce soir, written for Vogues Hommes in 1978, reprinted in Incidents, by Seuil.
 Daniel Garcia, Les années Palace, by Flammarion.
 Jean Rouzaud and Guy Marineau, Le Palace:  Remember, by Hoebeke.

External links

Nightclubs in France
Buildings and structures in the 9th arrondissement of Paris
Electronic dance music venues